Igor Anatolievich Romishevsky (March 25, 1940 – September 28, 2013) was a Russian ice hockey player who played in the Soviet Hockey League. At the 1968 Winter Olympics and 1972 Winter Olympics he won the gold medals with the Soviet team. He was gold medalist of the World Championships from 1969 to 1971 and silver medalist in 1972.

Romishevsky was born in Zhukovsky, Moscow Oblast. He graduated from Moscow Forest Engineering Institute 1969 and received his PhD degree in 1974.

During his professional hockey career he played with HC CSKA Moscow.

He was later inducted into the Russian and Soviet Hockey Hall of Fame in 1968.

In 1974–1979 Romishevsky was a chair of Sports Department at Moscow Institute of Physics and Technology. Since 1979 he was a head coach of SKA Leningrad for two seasons. In 1984–1990 Romishevsky was a head coach of SKA Novosibirsk.

He died at age 73, on 28 September 2013, in Moscow.

References

External links
 Team CCCP Players Info 
 

1940 births
2013 deaths
HC CSKA Moscow players
Russian ice hockey defencemen
Olympic gold medalists for the Soviet Union
Medalists at the 1968 Winter Olympics
Medalists at the 1972 Winter Olympics
Olympic ice hockey players of the Soviet Union
Olympic medalists in ice hockey
Ice hockey players at the 1968 Winter Olympics
Ice hockey players at the 1972 Winter Olympics
Soviet ice hockey coaches
Moscow State Forest University alumni
Academic staff of the Moscow Institute of Physics and Technology
Recipients of the Order of Honour (Russia)
Burials in Troyekurovskoye Cemetery